Zohan Rural District is a rural district (dehestan) in Zohan District, Zirkuh County, South Khorasan Province, Iran. At the 2006 census, its population was 5,908, in 1,505 families.  The rural district has 16 villages, such as Boznabad-e Jadid.

References 

Rural Districts of South Khorasan Province
Zirkuh County